North Ontario may refer to:
 Northern Ontario, the northern portion of the Canadian province of Ontario
 Upland, a community in California formerly named North Ontario